Jacksonville, Florida has operated Fireboats, including a fleet of three fireboats from 1999 to 2001, according to the Federal Emergency Management Agency (FEMA). While other cities require the master, at most, to be US Coast Guard certified, Jacksonville requires all crew members to be certified capable of serving as the master of a vessel of up to 100 tons.

During the 1999–2001 period, Jacksonville fireboats were called for water rescues on 486 occasions.
They were called to fight fires 193 times.

In 1922 the city commissioned the John C. Callahan as its first fireboat.

References

Jacksonville
Government of Jacksonville, Florida